The 1907 Mercer Baptists football team represented Mercer University as a member of the Southern Intercollegiate Athletic Association (SIAA) during the 1907 college football season. They finished with a record of 3–3 and were outscored by their opponents 28–170.

Schedule

References

Mercer
Mercer Bears football seasons
Mercer Baptists football